Ruth Nalmakarra (born 1954) is an Indigenous Australian artist known for her weaving, painting, and community leadership.

Biography 
Ruth Nalmakarra was born in 1954 at Galiwin'ku (Elcho Island) in Arnhem Land, Australia. She moved to Milingibi in the late 1960s. She is a member of the Garrawurra Liyagauwumirr clan. After the death of Nalmakarra's father, Madanggala Garrawurra, her uncle Nupurray Garrawurra raised her and her siblings. Nupurray's other children include artists Margaret Rarru, Lena Walunydjanalil, and Helen Ganalmirrawuy.

Career 
Throughout her career as an artist, Ruth Nalmakarra has been a weaver, painter, and curator. She has been weaving since she was a little girl, and was later taught painting by her family. From 1988 to 1993, she was a teacher's aid and tutor at Milingimbi Primary School, and from 2001 to 2003, she worked as an administration assistant and researcher at the Elcho Island Knowledge Centre.

Nalmakarra's late-brother Mickey Durrng, and his brother, Tony Dhanyala were the only people authorized to paint the Dijirri-didi: the Liyagauwumirr's clan design that is painted on the body during the Ngarra cleansing ceremony, in which the Liyagauwumirr paint their bodies and ceremonial objects. The Ngarra ceremony is not only a mortuary ritual, but also a celebration of regeneration in which the people remember the travels of the Dja'nkawu Sisters. Prior to his death in 2006, Durrng made the decision to pass the knowledge and the authority to paint the Dijirri-didi design to his Nalmakarra and her family, not because there were no available men to pass the knowledge to, but because he believed Nalmakarra would be the best person to ensure the continuation of the stories.

Nalmakarra held a position as assistant manager at the Milingimbi Art and Culture Centre from 2005 to 2009, in addition to being an artist and member of the board. In 2008, Nalmakarra curated the show, Yunumu: The Garrawarra artists of Milingimbi at Collingwood's Mossenson Galleries. Currently, she is a special advisor to the board of directors at Arnhem, Northern and Kimberley Artists (ANKA), the peak advocacy and support body for Aboriginal artists and Art Centres across Northern Australia. Nalmakarra has been involved with ANKA since 2007.

Collections 

National Gallery of Victoria, Melbourne

Significant exhibitions 
 2012: Sharing Our Spirit. Woolloongabba Art Gallery, Brisbane, Australia.
 2017: Ochre. NOMAD Art Gallery, Darwin, Australia.
 2020: long water. Museum of Modern Art Australia (MOMAA), Melbourne, Australia.

References

Further reading 
 Skerritt, Henry, "Choosing Who Will Keep the Stories Strong," Artlink 29, no. 3 (September 2009): 74–76. https://www.artlink.com.au/articles/3290/choosing-who-will-keep-the-stories-strong/ 
 Hamby, Louise, "Garrawurra Dupun," in The Inside World, ed. Henry Skerritt, (Munich:Prestel,2019).   
 "Ruth Ngalmakarra at the Milingimbi Art and Culture Centre," Creative Cowboy Films. https://www.creativecowboyfilms.com/blog_posts/ruth-ngalmakarra-at-the-milingimbi-art-and-culture-centre  
 "Ruth Nalmakarra," Milingimbi Art and Culture. http://www.milingimbiart.com/project/ruth-nalmakarra/  
 Burchall, Greg, "Sacred Ancestral Legacy in Living Colour." The Age: June, 2008. https://www.theage.com.au/entertainment/art-and-design/sacred-ancestral-legacy-in-living-colour-20080619-ge767j.html  http://www.anka.org.au/about/board-staff/

1954 births
Living people
20th-century Australian artists
21st-century Australian artists
Indigenous Australian artists
Artists from the Northern Territory
20th-century Australian women artists
21st-century Australian women artists